Montefalcione is a town and comune of the province of Avellino in the Campania region of southern Italy.

In 1861 it was the location of a revolt against the newly formed government of Italy.

People
Nicola Mancino

References

External links
 Official website
 Montefalcione tourist information

Cities and towns in Campania